Giammarco Buttazzo (born 23 August 1977) is an Italian male long-distance runner who won one national championship.

Biography
He competed at two editions of the IAAF World Cross Country Championships (2006, 2008), two of the IAAF World Half Marathon Championships and four editions of the European Cross Country Championships (2006, 2014), winning a medal with the national team in 2009.

References

External links
 

1977 births
Living people
Italian male long-distance runners
Athletics competitors of Gruppo Sportivo Esercito